On 14 March 2013, Chinese exchange student and intern Chen Shuangxi attacked his co-workers at the Kawaguchi Suisan fish-processing firm in Etajima, Hiroshima, Japan. Two people were killed and six others were injured.

Attack
Chen attacked his co-workers with a shovel and a knife. Nobuyuki Kawaguchi, 55, the president of the Kawaguchi Suisan oyster farm, and female co-worker Masako Hashishita, 68, were killed in the attack. One man and five women were injured.

Trial
Chen testified that shortly before the incident he heard his name mentioned by colleagues. Hiroshima police believe he might have misunderstood colleagues and wrongly believed that they insulted him.

References

Murder in Japan
Deaths by stabbing in Japan
Mass stabbings in Japan
March 2013 events in Japan
History of Hiroshima Prefecture
Knife attacks
2013 murders in Asia
2013 murders in Japan